The Jamaica national badminton team represents Jamaica in international badminton team competitions. It is controlled by the Jamaica Badminton Association, the governing body for badminton in Jamaica. The Jamaican mixed team participated three times in the Sudirman Cup and were eliminated in the group stages.

The Jamaican mixed team also finished in fourth place at the 2016 Pan Am Badminton Championships. The national team's best result was achieving a third place position at the 2018 Pan Am Badminton Championships after defeating Peru in the bronze medal tie with a score of 3-0.

Participation in BWF competitions

Sudirman Cup

Participation in Pan American Badminton Championships 

Men's team
{| class="wikitable"
|-
! Year !! Result
|-
| 2010 || Group stage
|-
| 2012 || Group stage
|-
| 2018 ||  Third place
|}Women's teamMixed team'''

Current squad 

Men
Samuel Ricketts
Joel Angus
Gareth Henry
Matthew Lee
Anthony McNee
Dennis Coke
Kemar Valentine
Shane Wilson

Women
Alana Bailey
Taina Dailey
Shezelle McTyson
Tahlia Richardson
Katherine Wynter

References

Badminton
National badminton teams
Badminton in Jamaica